Augustin is a 1995 French comedy film directed by Anne Fontaine. It was screened in the Un Certain Regard section at the 1995 Cannes Film Festival.

Cast
Jean-Chrétien Sibertin-Blanc as Augustin
Maggie Cheung as Ling
Stéphanie Zhang as Caroline
Guy Casabonne as Cyril Cachones
Darry Cowl as René
Bernard Campan as Boutinot
Nora Habib as Shula
Claude Pecher as M Poirer
James Lord as American Client
Jacqueline Vimpierre as Madam Balavoine
Rahim Mazioud as Maitre d'hotel
René Boulet as M. Linette
Thierry Lhermitte as himself

References

External links

1995 films
1995 comedy films
1990s French-language films
French comedy films
Films directed by Anne Fontaine
1990s French films